Superior General of the Society of Saint Pius X is the title given to the head of the traditionalist Society of Saint Pius X (or SSPX) founded by Archbishop Marcel Lefebvre in 1970.

History 
The Society of Saint Pius X was founded in 1970, and Archbishop Lefebvre became interim Superior General. In this time, he wrote the Constitution of the Society of Saint Pius X. The Superior General resides at the SSPX General House in Menzingen, Switzerland.

The Society of Saint Pius X meets every twelve years at their general chapter to elect a new Superior General or vote to reelect the current Superior General.

Current Superior General 
On July 11, 2018, Davide Pagliarani was elected for a 12 year term as Superior General of the Society of Saint Pius X. This position was previously held by Bishop Bernard Fellay, a Swiss Catholic Bishop.

Davide Pagliarani was ordained a priest in 1996.

List of Superior Generals

Notes

References 

 
Traditionalist Catholicism
Traditionalist Catholics